Loredana Simonetti (born 28 August 1930) was an Italian female middle-distance runner, who won nine national championships at individual senior level from 1949 to 1954 in two different specialities.

Biography
Loredana Simonetti was several times national champion in the 800 m and in the cross-country running, participating in the European Championships in Berne in 1954.

National records
 800 metres: 2:16.5,  Berne, 25 August 1954. Record held until 6 June 1958 (broken by Gilda Jannaccone)

National titles
 Italian Athletics Championships
 800 metres: 1949, 1950, 1951, 1952, 1953, 1954 (6)
Italian Cross Country Championships
 Cross-country running: 1950, 1951, 1954 (3)

References

External links
 

1930 births
Living people
Italian female middle-distance runners
20th-century Italian women
21st-century Italian women